Colonel Sir Percival Scrope Marling, 3rd Baronet, VC, CB, DL (6 March 1861 – 29 May 1936) was an English British Army officer and recipient of the Victoria Cross, the highest and most prestigious award for gallantry in the face of the enemy that can be awarded to British and Commonwealth forces.

Early life
Marling was born on 6 March 1861, the son of William Henry Marling. He was educated at Harrow School.

Military career
Marling was commissioned a second lieutenant on 11 August 1880, and promoted to lieutenant on 1 July 1881.

He was 23 years old, and a lieutenant in the 3rd Battalion, The King's Royal Rifle Corps, British Army, attached Mounted Infantry during the Mahdist War when the following deed took place for which he was awarded the VC.

On 13 March 1884 at the Battle of Tamai in the Sudan during the Mahdist War, Lieutenant Marling risked his life to save that of a private of The Royal Sussex Regiment who had been shot. His citation reads:

Marling was promoted to captain on 22 December 1888 and to major on 12 August 1896.

He served in the Second Boer War (1899–1902) in South Africa, where in March 1901 he took over the command of the 18th Hussars. He was promoted to lieutenant-colonel on 19 February 1902. For his service during the war, he was mentioned in despatches (dated 8 April 1902) and appointed a Companion of the Order of the Bath (CB) in the South Africa honours list published on 26 June 1902. After the war ended in June 1902 he returned home on the SS Sicilia, which arrived at Southampton in October 1902, and he received the actual decoration of CB from King Edward VII during an investiture at Buckingham Palace on 24 October 1902.

On 20 October 1903, he was appointed a deputy lieutenant of Gloucestershire, and in 1923 was appointed High Sheriff of Gloucestershire.

He later achieved the rank of colonel and died on 29 May 1936. He wrote an autobiography, Rifleman And Hussar (John Murray, London, 1931) detailing his military career.

The Medal
His VC is on display in the Lord Ashcroft Gallery at the Imperial War Museum, London.

References

 Location of grave and VC medal (Gloucestershire)

1861 births
1936 deaths
Burials in Gloucestershire
Military personnel from Gloucestershire
People from Stroud District
Graduates of the Royal Military College, Sandhurst
Baronets in the Baronetage of the United Kingdom
King's Royal Rifle Corps officers
British recipients of the Victoria Cross
Companions of the Order of the Bath
Deputy Lieutenants of Gloucestershire
High Sheriffs of Gloucestershire
People educated at Harrow School
British Army personnel of the Mahdist War
18th Royal Hussars officers
British Army personnel of the Second Boer War
British Army personnel of World War I
British Army personnel of the Anglo-Egyptian War
Councillors in Gloucestershire
British Army recipients of the Victoria Cross
British military personnel of the First Boer War